Marcel Blažo (born 8 January 1974) is a Slovak swimmer. He competed in two events at the 1992 Summer Olympics.

References

1974 births
Living people
Slovak male swimmers
Olympic swimmers of Czechoslovakia
Swimmers at the 1992 Summer Olympics
Sportspeople from Bratislava
20th-century Slovak people
21st-century Slovak people